The 1884 Cincinnati Outlaw Reds finished with a 69–36 record in the Union Association, finishing in third place (second among teams that played a full schedule). This was the only season the team existed, and indeed the only season the Union Association existed.

Regular season

Season standings

Record vs. opponents

Opening Day lineup

Roster

Player stats

Batting

Starters by position 
Note: Pos = Position; G = Games played; AB = At bats; H = Hits; Avg. = Batting average; HR = Home runs

Other batters 
Note: G = Games played; AB = At bats; H = Hits; Avg. = Batting average; HR = Home runs

Pitching

Starting pitchers 
Note: G = Games pitched; IP = Innings pitched; W = Wins; L = Losses; ERA = Earned run average; SO = Strikeouts

Other pitchers 
Note: G = Games pitched; IP = Innings pitched; W = Wins; L = Losses; ERA = Earned run average; SO = Strikeouts

Postseason 
The Outlaw Reds played a postseason series against the first place team in the UA, the St. Louis Maroons. The Outlaw Reds managed just four wins in sixteen games against the league champs.

Notes

References 
 Society for Cincinnati Sports Research
 1884 Cincinnati Outlaw Reds team page at Baseball Reference

Cincinnati Outlaw Reds season
Cincinnati Outlaw Reds
Cincinnati Outlaw Reds
Baseball teams established in 1884
Baseball teams disestablished in 1884
1884 establishments in Ohio
1884 disestablishments in Ohio